Pierre Fontaine may refer to:
 Pierre Fontaine (composer) (c. 1380 – c.1450), French composer of the Burgundian school
 Peter Fontaine (born Pierre Fontaine; 1691–1757), Virginia clergyman
 Pierre François Léonard Fontaine (1762–1853), neoclassical French architect
 Pierre Fontaine, former leader of the Communist Party of Quebec